Ross James Jennings (13 November 1944 – 25 March 2016) was a New Zealand actor, becoming one of New Zealand's most experienced television  producers and directors, whose credits included The Mad Dog Gang, Close to Home, Moynihan, Inside Straight, feature film I Live with Me Dad, Australian TV series Special Squad and Acropolis Now, NZ's soap Homeward Bound,  New Zealand's first reality series,  Police Ten 7, Middlemore, Strip Search, and Melody Rules.

Early life
Born in Hawera in 1944, Jennings was raised by his mother in Taihape and Hawera, his father having died during World War II.

Acting career
As a member of the NZ Players and Children's Art Theatre,  Ross Jennings toured NZ as an actor before being granted a QE2 Arts Council Grant to study acting in England where he worked at Salisbury Theatre and took on minor television and film roles, before returning to New Zealand in 1971.

He joined the NZBC in 1973, and the Drama Department within 18 months, mentored by producer Tony Issac.

He was appointed Head of Drama for TVNZ in the late 70's and left for Australia to work with Grundy Productions and finally to head Crawford Production's Development Department in 1982. During this period he produced his first feature film, I Live with Me Dad.

His return to New Zealand in 1987 saw him create and produce some of New Zealand's most successful television amongst which is NZ's longest running reality series, Police Ten 7, and the hugely successful Strip Search.

He devised, created and produced TVNZ's highly successful 36 hr live to air Millenium Show as well as devising, creating and producing Maori Television's ANZAC Day show - a 17-hour, annual, live to air programme which played a large part in the resurgence of the ANZAC Day revitalisation in NZ, as well as becoming Maori Television's flagship programme.

In his final year, he wrote, co-directed, and produced the live, outdoor performance of The Passion Play staged at the Villa Maria winery in Mangere in 2015.

His final series, which he devised to demystify the running of NZ Parliament, Inside Parliament, was in production when he died.

Death and funeral
Ross Jennings, a former head of drama at TVNZ, died on 25 March 2016, aged 71. His death was preceded by that of his mother-in-law, Edna Peters, 96, who died the same day. He left behind his wife, Carmel Jennings, whom he ran his production company, Just The Ticket Productions with, also a television and film producer, and six children. 

The family held funerals on consecutive days the following week at St Patrick's Roman Catholic Church in Pukekohe.

Filmography

Film

Television 
The numbers in writing credits refer to the number of episodes.

References

1944 births
2016 deaths
People from Hāwera
New Zealand television producers
New Zealand television directors
New Zealand Roman Catholics
Deaths from cancer in New Zealand